"Perfect Love" is MAX's 20th single on the Avex Trax label and was released on May 16, 2001. The title track was the "Kacchao" commercial song. The song debuted and peaked at #10 on the Oricon charts and is currently their last top 10 single.

"Perfect Love" was to serve as the lead single from their then-upcoming fifth studio album, originally to be released on March 20, 2002. However, due to lead singer Mina's marriage and pregnancy, the album was shelved and replaced with a second greatest hits album, Precious Collection 1995–2002.

Track list

Production

Music
 Executive producer: Johnny Taira
 Producer: Max Matsuura
 Co-producer: Junichi "Randy" Tsuchiya
 Recording director: Yukihito Sakakibara
 Mixed by Naoki Yamada, Hiroto Kobayashi
 Mixed at Planet Kingdom Studio
 Recording Engineers: Hiroto Kobayashi, Eiji Kameda
 Computer programmer: T2ya
 Mastered by Shigeo Miyamoto

Art direction & design
 Art direction & design: Katsuhito Tadokoro
 Photography: Kazuyoshi Shimomura
 Stylist: Akarumi Someya
 Hair & Make-up: Maki Tawa
 Coordinated by Shunsuke Emaru, Naoki Ueda

Charts
Oricon Sales Chart (Japan)

References

2001 singles
MAX (band) songs
Song recordings produced by T2ya
Songs written by T2ya
2001 songs
Avex Trax singles